Ann Rork Light (June 12, 1908 – January 23, 1988) was an American silent film actress.

Early life
Ann Rork was born June 12, 1908, in Darien, Connecticut. Her father, Sam E. Rork, was a film producer at First National Pictures, and her mother the former Helen Welch. Actor Will Rogers was her godfather.

Career
She starred in silent films such as The Blonde Saint and Old Loves and New in 1926, followed by The Notorious Lady, A Texas Steer and The Prince of Headwaiters in 1927. Her co-stars included Will Rogers and Rudolph Valentino.

Personal life
She was married five times. Her first husband was J. Paul Getty, an oil heir from San Francisco, California, from 1932 to 1935. They had two sons: John Paul Getty, Jr. and Gordon Getty. From her first-born son, John, she had a grandson, John Paul Getty III, who also became an actor.

She then married a succession of three other men. In 1960, she married her fifth husband, Dr. Rudolph A. Light, an Upjohn Pharmaceutical Company heir and Professor of Neurosurgery at Vanderbilt University in Nashville, Tennessee.

Death
She died of emphysema and lung cancer on January 23, 1988, at the Vanderbilt University Medical Center. She is buried with her husband Dr. Rudolph Light, at the Royal Palm Memorial Gardens in West Palm Beach, Florida. She was seventy-nine years old.

References

External links

1908 births
1988 deaths
People from Darien, Connecticut
People from Nashville, Tennessee
20th-century American actresses
Getty family
Actresses from Connecticut
American silent film actresses
Deaths from emphysema
Deaths from lung cancer
Deaths from cancer in Tennessee